The Japan men's national volleyball team represents Japan in international volleyball competitions and friendly matches, governed by Japan Volleyball Association. Their nickname is "RYUJIN NIPPON (龍神 NIPPON)", meaning "Japanese Dragon God" or "Dragon God of Japan" in Japanese. Japan won a bronze medal at the Tokyo 1964 Olympic Games, followed by silver at Mexico 1968 and a gold at Munich 1972. The years after this have been less successful. Japan missed three successive Olympic Games before returning at Beijing 2008, where they failed to win a match. Japan then failed to qualify for the London 2012 Olympic Games and also missed Rio 2016 after finishing seventh at the World Olympic Qualification Tournament in Tokyo.

They also failed to qualify for the 2014 FIVB World Championship the first edition they had missed in 54 years. They had previously won FIVB World Championship bronze medals in 1970 and 1974. Japan silver medalists at the 1969 and 1977 World Cup. Japan has been less successful in the World League era. The team has won the Asian Championships nine times and the Asian Games eight times.

In August 2021, at 2020 Summer Olympic Games in Tokyo, Japan team advanced to the Quarterfinals round and eventually finished at seventh place, the highest rank since 29 years.

Results

Olympic Games
 Champions   Runners up   Third place   Fourth place

World Championship
 Champions   Runners up   Third place   Fourth place

World Cup
 Champions   Runners up   Third place   Fourth place

World Grand Champions Cup
 Champions   Runners up   Third place   Fourth place

World/Nations League
 Champions   Runners up   Third place   Fourth place

Asian Championship
 Champions   Runners up   Third place   Fourth place

Asian Games
 Champions   Runners up   Third place   Fourth place

Asian Cup
 Champions   Runners up   Third place   Fourth place

Goodwill Games 
 Champions   Runners up   Third place   Fourth place

Team

Current squad

The following is the Japanese roster for 2022 FIVB Volleyball Men's World Championship.

Head coach:  Philippe Blain

Former squads
2011 Japan Men's national volleyball team roster
Daisuke Usami (c), Yuta Abe, Shogo Okamoto, Takahiro Yamamoto, Yuya Ageba, Yusuke Ishijima, Yu Koshikawa, Yuta Yoneyama, Seima Kanda, Tatsuya Fukuzawa, Kunihiro Shimizu, Daisuke Yako, Kota Yamamura, Takashi Dekita, Yamato Fushimi, Osamu Tanabe, Daisuke Sakai, Takeshi Nagano, Takeshi Kitajima, Kazuyoshi Yokota, and Masashi Kuriyama. Head Coach: Tatsuya Ueta.
2012 Japan Men's national volleyball team roster
Daisuke Sakai, Yuta Abe, Takeshi Nagano, Yusuke Matsuta, Daisuke Usami, Yoshifumi Suzuki, Takahiro Yamamoto, Yuya Ageba, Takaaki Tomimatsu, Osamu Tanabe, Yoshihiko Matsumoto, Kota Yamamura, Tatsuya Fukuzawa, Kunihiro Shimizu, Daisuke Yako, Yusuke Ishijima, Yu Koshikawa, Yuta Yoneyama, Akira Koshiya, Ayumu Shinoda, Shigeru Kondoh, Yuji Suzuki, Dai Tezuka, Takashi Dekita and Kazuyoshi Yokota. Head Coach: Tatsuya Ueta.
2013 Japan Men's national volleyball team roster
Yuta Abe, Shigeru Kondoh, Takahisa Otake, Shogo Okamoto, Akihiro Fukatsu, Hideomi Fukatsu, Issei Maeda, Yusuke Ishijima, Yu Koshikawa, Yuta Yoneyama, Yasuyuki Shibakoya, Yuji Suzuki, Tatsuya Fukuzawa, Yuhei Tsukazaki, Kunihiro Shimizu, Takuya Takamatsu, Masashi Kuriyama, Daisuke Yako, Dai Tezuka, Shunsuke Chijiki, Yuta Matsuoka, Yuki Hosokawa, Sogo Watanabe, Hidetomo Hoshino, Takashi Dekita, Shuzo Yamada, Masahiro Yanagida, Kota Yamamura, Yoshihiko Matsumoto, Yusuke Matsuta, Yoshifumi Suzuki, Kenji Shirasawa, Takaaki Tomimatsu, Kazuyoshi Yokota, Tatsuya Shiota, Haku Ri, Yamato Fushimi, Takeshi Nagano, Koichiro Koga, Ken Takahashi and Taichiro Koga. Head Coach: Sato Gary.
2014 Japan Men's national volleyball team roster
Shinji Takahashi, Shohei Uchiyama, Hideomi Fukatsu, Sho Sagawa, Yu Koshikawa, Yuta Yoneyama, Tatsuya Fukuzawa, Kunihiro Shimizu, Masashi Kuriyama, Ryusuke Tsubakiyama, Daisuke Yako, Dai Tezuka, Shunsuke Chijiki, Naoya Shiraiwa, Sogo Watanabe, Masahiro Yanagida, Kentaro Takahashi, Yūki Ishikawa, Takaaki Tomimatsu, Hideoki Eto, Haku Ri, Takashi Dekita, Yamato Fushimi, Kentaro Hoshiya, Akihiro Yamauchi, Koichiro Koga, Takeshi Nagano and Satoshi Ide. Head coach: Masashi Nambu.
2015 Japan Men's national volleyball team roster
Yuta Abe, Shunsuke Inoue, Akihiro Fukatsu, Hideomi Fukatsu, Yuta Yoneyama, Kunihiro Shimizu (c), Masashi Kuriyama, Daisuke Yako, Shunsuke Chijiki, Yuta Matsuoka, Sogo Watanabe, Hiroaki Asano, Masahiro Yanagida, Kenya Fujinaka, Kentaro Takahashi, Yūki Ishikawa, Yuki Suzuki, Yoshifumi Suzuki, Takaaki Tomimatsu, Takashi Dekita, Kentaro Hoshiya, Yuichiro Komiya, Akihiro Yamauchi, Yasunari Kodama, Issei Otake, Taishi Onodera, Daisuke Sakai, Koichiro Koga, Takeshi Nagano and Taiki Tsuruda. Head coach: Masashi Nambu.
2016 Japan Men's national volleyball team roster
Shinji Takahashi, Akihiro Fukatsu, Hideomi Fukatsu, Masahiro Sekita, Yu Koshikawa, Yuta Yoneyama, Tatsuya Fukuzawa, Kunihiro Shimizu (c), Masashi Kuriyama, Daisuke Yako, Naoya Shiraiwa, Hidetomo Hoshino, Hiroaki Asano, Masahiro Yanagida, Kentaro Takahashi, Tsubasa Hisahara, Yūki Ishikawa, Yoshifumi Suzuki, Takaaki Tomimatsu, Ryota Denda, Takashi Dekita, Akihiro Yamauchi, Yasunari Kodama, Taishi Onodera, Daisuke Sakai, Koichiro Koga, Takeshi Nagano and Shunsuke Watanabe. Head coach: Masashi Nambu.
2017 Japan Men's national volleyball team roster
Akihiro Fukatsu, Hideomi Fukatsu  (c), Naonobu Fujii, Masahiro Sekita, Yuta Yoneyama, Yuji Suzuki, Kunihiro Shimizu, Takuya Takamatsu, Masashi Kuriyama, Hiroaki Asano, Masahiro Yanagida, Shuzo Yamada, Naoya Takano, Takeshi Ogawa, Tsubasa Hisahara, Issei Otake, Yūki Ishikawa, Yuki Suzuki, Yudai Arai, Takaaki Tomimatsu, Haku Ri, Ryota Denda, Takashi Dekita, Akihiro Yamauchi, Kentaro Takahashi, Taishi Onodera, Taichiro Koga, Taiki Tsuruda, Satoshi Ide and Shohei Yamamoto. Head coach: Yuichi Nakagaichi.
2018 Japan Men's national volleyball team roster
Hideomi Fukatsu, Naonobu Fujii, Masahiro Sekita, Masaki Oya, Motoki Eiro, Tatsuya Fukuzawa, Takuya Takamatsu, Shunsuke Chijiki, Hiroaki Asano, Masahiro Yanagida (c), Naoya Takano, Tsubasa Hisahara, Yūki Ishikawa, Hiroki Ozawa, Jin Tsuzuki, Kunihiro Shimizu, Takashi Dekita, Takeshi Ogawa, Issei Otake, Yudai Arai, Yuji Nishida, Haku Ri, Ryota Denda, Yamato Fushimi, Akihiro Yamauchi, Kentaro Takahashi, Taishi Onodera, Hirohito Kashimura, Shinichiro Sato, Taichiro Koga, Satoshi Ide, Ryuta Homma, Wataru Inoue and Tomohiro Horie. Head coach: Yuichi Nakagaichi.
2019 Japan Men's national volleyball team roster
Akihiro Fukatsu, Hideomi Fukatsu, Naonobu Fujii, Masahiro Sekita, Tatsuya Fukuzawa, Masashi Kuriyama, Hiroaki Asano, Naoya Takano, Tsubasa Hisahara, Yūki Ishikawa, Yuki Higuchi, Jin Tsuzuki, Kunihiro Shimizu, Issei Otake, Yūji Nishida, Haku Ri, Takashi Dekita, Akihiro Yamauchi, Kentaro Takahashi, Taishi Onodera, Taichiro Koga, Masahiro Yanagida (c), Satoshi Ide and Tomohiro Yamamoto. Head coach: Yuichi Nakagaichi.
2020 Japan Men's national volleyball team roster
Kunihiro Shimizu, Taishi Onodera, Naonobu Fujii, Issei Otake, Tatsuya Fukuzawa, Akihiro Yamauchi, Tsubasa Hisahara, Masahiro Yanagida (c), Hideomi Fukatsu, Taichiro Koga, Yūji Nishida, Masahiro Sekita, Kenya Fujinaka, Yūki Ishikawa, Haku Lee, Kentaro Takahashi, Masaki Oya, Tomohiro Yamamoto, Yudai Arai, Ryuta Homma, Yutaro Takemoto, Kenta Takanashi, Yuki Higuchi, Shoma Tomita, Shunichiro Sato, Tatsunori Otsuka and Ran Takahashi. Head coach: Yuichi Nakagaichi.
2021 Japan Men's national volleyball team roster
Kunihiro Shimizu, Taishi Onodera, Naonobu Fujii, Issei Otake, Tatsuya Fukuzawa, Akihiro Yamauchi, Masahiro Yanagida, Hideomi Fukatsu, Taichiro Koga, Yūji Nishida, Masahiro Sekita, Masaki Oya, Yūki Ishikawa (c), Haku Lee, Kentaro Takahashi, Kenta Takanashi, Shoma Tomita, Tatsunori Otsuka, Tomohiro Yamamoto, Ran Takahashi, Taichi Fukuyama, Shunichiro Sato, Tomohiro Ogawa and Kento Miyaura. Head coach: Yuichi Nakagaichi.
2022 Japan Men's national volleyball team roster
Yuji Nishida, Taishi Onodera, Akihiro Fukatsu, Issei Otake, Tatsunori Otsuka, Akihiro Yamauchi, Kenta Takanashi, Masahiro Sekita, Masaki Oya, Kentaro Takahashi, Shoma Tomita, Ran Takahashi, Tomohiro Ogawa, Yūki Ishikawa (c), Haku Lee, Kento Miyaura, Akito Yamazaki, Kenyu Nakamoto, Takahiro Shin, Tomohiro Yamamoto, Motoki Eiro, Yuki Higuchi, Shunichiro Sato, Kazuyuki Takahashi, Shunsuke Nakamura, Go Murayama, Kenta Koga, Hiroki Ito, Soshi Fujinaka, Larry Ebade-Dan, Yuga Tarumi, Keitaro Nishikawa, Hiroaki Maki, Masato Kai, Kento Asano and Yuichiro Komiya. Head coach: Philippe Blain.

Coach history
List from 1965 until now:

  (1965–1972)
 Tsutomu Koyama (1973–1976)
 Yūzo Nakamura (1977–1980)
 Naohiro Ikeda (1980–1984)
 Masaru Saito (1984–1986)
 Tsutomu Koyama (1986–1988)
 Masayuki Minami (1989–1990)
 Seiji Oko (1991–1995)
 Shinichiro Tsujiai (1996–1997)
 Futoshi Teramawari (1997–2000)
 Mikiyasu Tanaka (2001–2004)
 Tatsuya Ueta (2005–2013)
 Gary Sato (2013–2014)
 Masashi Nambu (2014–2016)
 Yuichi Nakagaichi (2016–2021)
 Philippe Blain (2021– )

Kit providers
The table below shows the history of kit providers for the Japan national volleyball team.

Sponsorship
Primary sponsors include: main sponsors like Shiseido other sponsors: Japanet, Molten, All Nippon Airways, Suntory, JTEKT, Nisshin Steel, Nippon Life, Marudai, Mizuno, Meiji Seika, Descente, Mikasa and Hisamitsu Pharmaceutical.

Stadium
Tokyo Metropolitan Gymnasium and Yoyogi National Gymnasium Japan national team training and hosting venues.

Media
Japan's matches and friendlies are currently televised by Nippon TV, GAORA and NHK.

See also
Volleyball
Japan women's national volleyball team
Japan men's national under-19 volleyball team
Japan men's national under-21 volleyball team

References

External links
 

 

National men's volleyball teams
M
Volleyball in Japan
Men's sport in Japan